Boucau is a railway station in Boucau, Nouvelle-Aquitaine, France. The station is located on the Bordeaux–Irun railway line. The station is served by TER (local) services operated by the SNCF.

Train services
The following services currently call at Boucau:
local service (TER Nouvelle-Aquitaine) Bordeaux - Dax - Bayonne - Hendaye

References

Railway stations in Pyrénées-Atlantiques